John Berryman (1914–1972) was an American poet and scholar.

John Berryman may also refer to:
 John Berryman (VC) (1825–1896), British soldier
 John Berryman (politician) (1828–1900), Canadian physician and political figure